"Glass Love Train" is a song recorded by British singer and songwriter Tanita Tikaram. Earmusic released the song on 22 January 2016 as the lead single from her ninth studio album Closer to the People.

Background
Tikaram explained that "The lyrics take the idea of someone travelling, reflecting on a love story – with subtle changes & insights mirroring the way the landscape changes when you are on a train." A newer version of the song was also included in her 2019 compilation album To Drink the Rainbow as a bonus track.

References

External links
 

2016 singles
Tanita Tikaram songs
Songs written by Tanita Tikaram
2016 songs